The name Nicholas has been used for five tropical cyclones worldwide, twice in the Atlantic Ocean and three times in the Australian region.

Atlantic Ocean: 
 Tropical Storm Nicholas (2003), long-lived and erratic tropical storm
 Hurricane Nicholas (2021), Category 1 hurricane that made landfall near Sargent, Texas,  bringing heavy rainfall and storm surge to parts of the U.S. Gulf Coast.

Australian Region:
 Cyclone Nicholas (1985), severe tropical cyclone that did not threaten land
 Cyclone Nicholas (1996), made landfall west of Derby, Australia
 Cyclone Nicholas (2008),  made landfall north of Carnarvon, Australia

Atlantic hurricane set index articles
Australian region cyclone set index articles